The Reynard 88D is an open-wheel Formula 3000 car, designed and developed by Malcolm Oastler, and constructed and built by British manufacturer Reynard Motorsport, for both the 1988 International Formula 3000 Championship, and the 1988 Japanese Formula 3000 Championship, as well as the 1989 British Formula 3000 Championship.

References 

Open wheel racing cars
International Formula 3000
Reynard Motorsport vehicles